The Salon is a British reality TV show where various members of the public (some famous) are invited daily to have treatments (mostly hair styles) in a studio built beauty salon situated in Balham, south-west London, and in the second series, a purpose-built studio inside the Trocadero, Piccadilly Circus.

Overview
Viewers were given an insight into the running and bickering of life in a professional salon with manager Paul Merritt and his team of trainees and employees. The show was most notable for bringing fame to Brazilian-born hairstylist, Ricardo Ribeiro and introducing viewers to Sharon and Ozzy Osbourne's nephew, Terry Longden.

Guests
Some of the show's celebrity guests included Linford Christie, Cheryl Baker, Carrie Grant, Linsey Dawn McKenzie, Simeon Williams, Brigitte Nielsen, Val Lehman, Michael Barrymore, and Lucy Pinder, Rory Bremner, Danni Behr, Donna Eyre, Neil Pickup and Michael Heseltine. Kat Chaplin

References

External links 
 The Salon at Channel4.com
 IMDb

2003 British television series debuts
2004 British television series endings
British reality television series
Channel 4 reality television shows
Television series by Banijay